Pratap Singh Shah, King of Nepal (1751–1777) was the second King of modern Nepal. He was the eldest son of Prithvi Narayan Shah, the king who started the unification of the Nepal.

He became King at the age of 24 in 1775. Pratap Singh Shah ruled only up to 1777 for 36 months, and died of smallpox at the age of 26. He was succeeded by his two-year-old son Rana Bahadur Shah. He did not actively participate in the unification campaign led by his father. The boundaries of Nepal continued to extend after his reign, as his wife Rajendra Laxmi and his brother Prince Bahadur Shah continued the unification campaign as regents of his son Ranabahadur Shah.

References

|-

1751 births
1777 deaths
Nepalese monarchs
Nepalese Hindus
Hindu monarchs
18th-century monarchs in Asia
Shah dynasty
People from Gorkha District
People of the Nepalese unification